Adolpho Tabacow (died after 1942) was Brazilian pianist of Jewish origin. His father was Rachmiel (Ramiro) Tabacow, invited to São Paulo by his uncle Isaac Tabacow in the first years of the 20th century. In 1942 he participated in a piano competition organized by Columbia Concerts and was viewed as a probable winner, but the first prize went to Arnaldo Estrela.

In addition to performing, Tabacow composed some music, one of his compositions being Lenda Casaca.

A street in a São Paulo neighbourhood  is named after him (Rua Adolfo Tabacow).

References 

Brazilian pianists
20th-century Portuguese people
20th-century pianists
Year of birth uncertain
Year of death uncertain
Brazilian Jews